Tasmanian West is an interim Australian bioregion located in the western region of Tasmania, comprising .

See also

 Ecoregions in Australia
 Interim Biogeographic Regionalisation for Australia
 Regions of Tasmania

References

Further reading
 Thackway, R and I D Cresswell (1995) An interim biogeographic regionalisation for Australia : a framework for setting priorities in the National Reserves System Cooperative Program Version 4.0 Canberra : Australian Nature Conservation Agency, Reserve Systems Unit, 1995. 

West, Tasmania
IBRA regions
Western Tasmania
South West Tasmania